Saurita coccinea is a moth in the subfamily Arctiinae. It was described by Max Wilhelm Karl Draudt in 1915. It is found in Bolivia.

References

Moths described in 1915
Saurita